Like It or Not is an EP by indie pop group Architecture in Helsinki, released on July 8, 2008. It features two remixes of the titular song, which originally appeared on the 2007 album Places Like This.

Track listing
Like It or Not (Version 2)
Beef in Box
One Heavy February 2008
Hold Music
Like It or Not (El Guincho Remix)

References

Architecture in Helsinki albums
2008 EPs
Polyvinyl Record Co. EPs
Indie pop EPs